Edgware & Hendon Reform Synagogue, a member of the Movement for Reform Judaism, is a Reform Judaism congregation at 118 Stonegrove, Edgware in the London Borough of Barnet. It was formed in 2017 as a result of the merger between the Edgware & District Reform Synagogue (EDRS) and the Hendon Reform Synagogue (HRS) communities. EDRS originated in 1934 as "Edgware and District Progressive Jewish Fellowship" and in February 1935 became “Edgware and District Reform Synagogue”. HRS was founded in 1949 and its first building, in 1955, was in Danescroft Avenue. The two communities merged in 2017, and the merged community is located on the site of the former EDRS.  It is now the largest synagogue in Europe; its membership includes 2500 families.

The senior rabbi is  Mark Goldsmith. He succeeded Danny Smith, who retired in summer 2019.

History

Edgware and District Reform Synagogue

A temporary committee was formed and the next three months saw a furious rate of activity. Committee meetings were held every few days, a variety of problems being addressed. At an early stage it was agreed that the new body would be called “Edgware and District Progressive Jewish Fellowship”. At that time the only Reform congregations in London were the West London Synagogue in Upper Berkeley Street and the North Western Reform Synagogue in Golders Green. The West London Synagogue and its minister, Rabbi Reinhart, had been very helpful in advising the Edgware committee about setting up an independent synagogue, and in December 1934 Rabbi Reinhart had addressed. a public meeting in Edgware on “The Problems of Judaism Today”. In January 1935 the West London Synagogue offered practical help by way of taking the Edgware children into its religion classes, without charge, provided that the children could be delivered and collected. Matters approached a climax during the first week of February 1935. Discussions had been held with officials at West London Synagogue on the practices of Reform, and the new body in Edgware decided to become a part of the Reform movement.

On 12 February 1935 it was formally decided to form a synagogue to be called “Edgware and District Reform Synagogue”.

Hendon Reform Synagogue

In the beginning, meetings were held in the homes of the founder members until the first synagogue, now the Kingsley Fisher Hall [named after founders Sidney Kingsley and Ben Fisher] was built several years later.  Services were held in the Methodist Meeting Hall in the Burroughs and as the congregation grew, in other local halls whilst they dreamt of having their own building. In 1950 a disused tennis club became available and was purchased for the sum of £2,600 with funds raised from donations and social events, and at last HRS had a plot on which to place a building.  Work was completed in 1955 and a consecration service for the new synagogue building was held on 6 March by the late Rabbi Dr Arthur Katz who had been Minister from the "dream's" beginning.

The congregation soon outgrew the original building and so after a further programme for fundraising, construction of the annexe which became the synagogue began in 1965. Two inspiring walls of stained glass windows were commissioned and then offered to congregants to donate in memory of their late loved ones. These magnificent windows depicting both Judaica and biblical scenes together with the marble walls surrounding the handmade ark provides the warm and serene backdrop of the synagogue.

A consecration service, attended by 500 people, took place on 14 January 1968.

The merger 
In 2016, after a series of meetings in both HRS and EDRS, members overwhelmingly voted to merge. Over the previous year, both communities had drawn closer, including the incorporation of HRS's cheder into EDRS's and holding joint Purim and Shavuot services. A new entity, Edgware & Hendon Reform Synagogue, was formed on EDRS's former ground, and the inaugural service on Saturday (Shabbat) 15 July 2017 was  attended by a huge congregation and also by civic leaders of the local community. The new community is named Edgware & Hendon Reform Synagogue in English and LeDor Vador in Hebrew (the latter also being the name of its monthly magazine). The merger has brought changes to the community, as aspects of the former Hendon and Edgware communities are incorporated.

See also
 List of Jewish communities in the United Kingdom
 List of former synagogues in the United Kingdom
 Movement for Reform Judaism

References

External links
 

2017 establishments in England
Edgware
Reform synagogues in the United Kingdom
Hendon